Hydrometra martini is a species of water measurer in the family Hydrometridae. It is found in North America.

References

Further reading

 
 
 

Hydrometroidea
Articles created by Qbugbot
Insects described in 1900